The Madison Wind Farm is a power generation plant located in the town of Madison, New York. Constructed in 1999-2000, it was the first wind farm completed in New York state and the first merchant wind farm in the country. The power plant consists of seven Vestas V66-1.65 MW wind turbines, generating enough energy to power up to 10,000 homes. The Vestas V66-1.65 MW wind turbines have a hub height of 67m and a 66m rotor diameter totally 100m to the top of the rotor

History 
The Madison Wind Farm was developed and funded by the unregulated arm of PG&E, by project manager Laura Walker; construction began in 1999. It was the first wind farm in New York State and the first merchant wind farm in the United States. The facility is located on private dairy farm land in the town and county of Madison, in upstate New York. The New York State alternative energy program supported its development.

These turbines can produce enough energy for up to 10,000 homes. The power produced by these turbines is routed to New Jersey. The wind farm is now owned by Horizon Wind Energy.

Two other wind farms: Fenner Wind Farm and Munnsville, have since been completed and are operating in Madison County.

Today 

The wind turbines have become a kind of tourist destination; people stop from U.S. Route 20 to see the facility.

This wind farm is the first of three wind farms in the county, the second being the Fenner Wind Farm nearby, and the third the Munnsville facility.

See also

 New York energy law

References 

Energy infrastructure completed in 2000
Wind farms in New York (state)
Buildings and structures in Madison County, New York
2000 establishments in New York (state)